Enam may refer to:

 Enam, Afghanistan, a village in Afghanistan
 Enam, Nancowry, a village in India
 ENAM or Enamelin, a human gene
 Alexis Enam (born 1986), Cameroonian footballer
 Enam Ali (born 1960), Bangladeshi-British businessman
 E-NAM! an electronic trading platform for agricultural products in India
 The number six (6) in the Indonesian and Malay languages
 Place mentioned in the Bible, see Enam

See also
 Inaam, a given name (including a list of people with the name)